Johnny Edward Gallimore (born 1964) is a former Republican member of the North Carolina State Senate, who represented the 29th district from 2019 to 2021. He also ran unsuccessfully for the state senate in 2012, 2014, 2016, and 2020.

Electoral history

2012

2014

2016

2018

2020

References

External links

Living people
1964 births
Republican Party North Carolina state senators